This list shows the IUCN Red List status of mammal species recorded in Germany. One of them is critically endangered, three are endangered, and several are near threatened. One of the species listed for Germany can no longer be found in the wild.
The following tags are used to highlight each species' IUCN Red List status as published by the International Union for Conservation of Nature:

Order: Rodentia (rodents) 

Rodents make up the largest order of mammals, with over 40% of mammalian species. They have two incisors in the upper and lower jaw which grow continually and must be kept short by gnawing.
Suborder: Sciurognathi
Family: Castoridae (beavers)
Genus: Castor
 American beaver, C. canadensis  introduced
 Eurasian beaver, C. fiber 
Family: Sciuridae (squirrels)
Subfamily: Sciurinae
Tribe: Sciurini
Genus: Sciurus
 Red squirrel, S. vulgaris 
Subfamily: Xerinae
Tribe: Marmotini
Genus: Marmota
 Alpine marmot, M. marmota 
Family: Gliridae (dormice)
Subfamily: Leithiinae
Genus: Dryomys
 Forest dormouse, Dryomys nitedula 
Genus: Eliomys
 Garden dormouse, E. quercinus 
Genus: Muscardinus
 Hazel dormouse, M. avellanarius 
Subfamily: Glirinae
Genus: Glis
 European edible dormouse, Glis glis 
Family: Cricetidae
Subfamily: Cricetinae
Genus: Cricetus
European hamster, C. cricetus 
Subfamily: Arvicolinae
Genus: Arvicola
 European water vole, A. amphibius 
Genus: Clethrionomys
 Bank vole, Clethrionomys glareolus 
 Grey red-backed vole, Clethrionomys rufocanus 
Genus: Microtus
 Field vole, Microtus agrestis 
 Common vole, Microtus arvalis 
 Bavarian pine vole, Microtus bavaricus 
 Tundra vole, Microtus oeconomus 
 European pine vole, Microtus subterraneus 
Family: Muridae (mice, rats, voles, gerbils, hamsters)
Subfamily: Murinae
Genus: Mus
 House mouse, M. musculus 
Genus: Apodemus
 Striped field mouse, Apodemus agrarius 
 Yellow-necked mouse, Apodemus flavicollis 
 Wood mouse, Apodemus sylvaticus 
Genus: Micromys
 Eurasian harvest mouse, Micromys minutus 
Genus: Rattus
Brown rat, R. norvegicus 
Black rat, R. rattus

Order: Lagomorpha (lagomorphs) 

The lagomorphs comprise two families, Leporidae (hares and rabbits), and Ochotonidae (pikas). Though they can resemble rodents, and were classified as a superfamily in that order until the early twentieth century, they have since been considered a separate order. They differ from rodents in a number of physical characteristics, such as having four incisors in the upper jaw rather than two.
Family: Leporidae (rabbits, hares)
Genus: Lepus
European hare, L. europaeus 
Mountain hare, L. timidus 
Genus: Oryctolagus
European rabbit, O. cuniculus  introduced

Order: Erinaceomorpha (hedgehogs and gymnures) 

The order Erinaceomorpha contains a single family, Erinaceidae, which comprise the hedgehogs and gymnures. The hedgehogs are easily recognised by their spines while gymnures look more like large rats.

Family: Erinaceidae (hedgehogs)
Subfamily: Erinaceinae
Genus: Erinaceus
 West European hedgehog, E. europaeus

Order: Soricomorpha (shrews, moles, and solenodons) 

The "shrew-forms" are insectivorous mammals. Shrews and solenodons closely resemble mice, while moles are stout-bodied burrowers.

Family: Soricidae (shrews)
Subfamily: Crocidurinae
Genus: Crocidura
 Bicolored shrew, C. leucodon 
 Greater white-toothed shrew, C. russula 
Lesser white-toothed shrew, C. suaveolens 
Subfamily: Soricinae
Tribe: Nectogalini
Genus: Neomys
 Southern water shrew, N. anomalus 
 Eurasian water shrew, N. fodiens 
Tribe: Soricini
Genus: Sorex
 Alpine shrew, S. alpinus 
 Common shrew, S. araneus 
 Crowned shrew, S. coronatus 
 Eurasian pygmy shrew, S. minutus 
Family: Talpidae (moles)
Subfamily: Talpinae
Tribe: Talpini
Genus: Talpa
 European mole, T. europaea

Order: Chiroptera (bats) 

The bats' most distinguishing feature is that their forelimbs are developed as wings, making them the only mammals capable of flight. Bat species account for about 20% of all mammals.
Family: Vespertilionidae
Subfamily: Myotinae
Genus: Myotis
Bechstein's bat, M. bechsteini 
Lesser mouse-eared bat, M. blythii 
Brandt's bat, M. brandti 
Pond bat, M. dasycneme 
Daubenton's bat, M. daubentonii  
Geoffroy's bat, M. emarginatus 
Greater mouse-eared bat, M. myotis 
Whiskered bat, M. mystacinus 
Natterer's bat, M. nattereri 
Subfamily: Vespertilioninae
Genus: Barbastella
Western barbastelle, B. barbastellus 
Genus: Eptesicus
Northern bat, E. nilssoni 
Serotine bat, E. serotinus 
Genus: Hypsugo
Savi's pipistrelle, H. savii 
Genus: Nyctalus
Greater noctule bat, N. lasiopterus 
Lesser noctule, N. leisleri 
Common noctule, N. noctula 
Genus: Pipistrellus
Nathusius' pipistrelle, P. nathusii 
Common pipistrelle, P. pipistrellus 
Genus: Plecotus
Brown long-eared bat, P. auritus 
Grey long-eared bat, P. austriacus 
Genus: Vespertilio
Parti-coloured bat, V. murinus 
Family: Molossidae
Genus: Tadarida
European free-tailed bat, T. teniotis 
Family: Rhinolophidae
Subfamily: Rhinolophinae
Genus: Rhinolophus
Greater horseshoe bat, R. ferrumequinum 
Lesser horseshoe bat, R. hipposideros

Order: Cetacea (whales) 

The order Cetacea includes whales, dolphins and porpoises. They are the mammals most fully adapted to aquatic life with a spindle-shaped nearly hairless body, protected by a thick layer of blubber, and forelimbs and tail modified to provide propulsion underwater.

Suborder: Mysticeti
Family: Balaenidae (right whales)
Genus: Eubalaena
 North Atlantic right whale, Eubalaena glacialis  
Family: Eschrichtiidae (gray whales)
Family: Balaenopteridae (rorqual)
Subfamily: Balaenopterinae
Genus: Balaenoptera
 Common minke whale, B. acutorostrata 
 Sei whale, Balaenoptera borealis 
 Fin whale, Balaenoptera physalus 
 Blue whale, Balaenoptera musculus 
Family: Megapterinae
Genus: Megaptera
 Humpback whale, Megaptera novaeangliae 
Suborder: Odontoceti
Superfamily: Platanistoidea
Family: Monodontidae (narwhals)
Genus: Monodon
 Narwhal, Monodon monoceros 
Genus: Delphinapterus
 Beluga whale, Delphinapterus leucas 
Family: Phocoenidae (porpoises)
Genus: Phocoena
 Harbour porpoise, Phocoena phocoena  or 
Family: Physeteridae (sperm whales)
Genus: Physeter
 Sperm whale, Physeter macrocephalus 
Family: Kogiidae
Genus: Kogia
 Pygmy sperm whale, K. breviceps 
Family: Ziphidae (beaked whales)
Genus: Ziphius
 Cuvier's beaked whale, Ziphius cavirostris 
Subfamily: Hyperoodontinae
Genus: Hyperoodon
 North Atlantic Bottlenose whale, Hyperoodon ampullatus 
Genus: Mesoplodon
 Sowerby's beaked whale, Mesoplodon bidens 
Family: Delphinidae (marine dolphins)
 Genus: Lagenorhynchus
 White-beaked dolphin, Lagenorhynchus albirostris 
 Atlantic white-sided dolphin, Lagenorhynchus acutus 
Genus: Delphis
 Short-beaked common dolphin, Delphinus delphis 
Genus: Tursiops
 Bottlenose dolphin, Tursiops truncatus 
Genus: Stenella
 Striped dolphin, Stenella coeruleoalba 
Genus: Grampus
 Risso's dolphin, Grampus griseus 
Genus: Globicephala
 Long-finned pilot whale, Globicephala melas 
Genus: Pseudorca
 False killer whale, Pseudorca crassidens 
Genus: Orcinus
 Orca, O. orca

Order: Carnivora (carnivorans) 

There are over 260 species of carnivorans, the majority of which feed primarily on meat. They have a characteristic skull shape and dentition.
Suborder: Feliformia
Family: Felidae
Subfamily: Felinae
Genus: Felis
 European wildcat, F. silvestris 
Genus: Lynx
 Eurasian lynx, L. lynx  reintroduced
Family: Viverridae
Subfamily: Viverrinae
Genus: Genetta
 Common genet, G. genetta  introduced, presence uncertain
Suborder: Caniformia
Family: Canidae
Genus: Canis
Golden jackal, C. aureus 
European jackal, C. a. moreoticus
Gray wolf, C. lupus 
Eurasian wolf, C. l. lupus
Genus: Nyctereutes
Raccoon dog, N. procyonoides  introduced 
Genus: Vulpes
Red fox, V. vulpes 
Family: Procyonidae
Genus: Procyon
 Raccoon, P. lotor  introduced
Family: Mustelidae
Genus: Lutra
 European otter, L. lutra 
Genus: Martes
Beech marten, M. foina 
European pine marten, M. martes 
Genus: Meles
European badger, M. meles 
Genus: Mustela
Stoat, M. erminea 
Least weasel, M. nivalis 
European polecat, M. putorius 
Genus: Neogale
American mink, N. vison  introduced
Family: Phocidae
Genus: Halichoerus
 Grey seal, H. grypus 
Genus: Phoca
 Harbor seal, P. vitulina 
Genus: Pusa
 Ringed seal, P. hispida

Order: Artiodactyla (even-toed ungulates) 

The even-toed ungulates are ungulates whose weight is borne about equally by the third and fourth toes, rather than mostly or entirely by the third as in perissodactyls. There are about 220 artiodactyl species, including many that are of great economic importance to humans.
Family: Bovidae (cattle, antelope, sheep, goats)
Subfamily: Bovinae
Genus: Bison
 European bison, B. bonasus  reintroduced
Subfamily: Caprinae
Genus: Capra
 Alpine ibex, C. ibex  reintroduced
Genus: Rupicapra
Chamois, R. rupicapra 
Family: Cervidae (deer)
Subfamily: Cervinae
Genus: Cervus
Red deer, C. elaphus 
Genus: Dama
 European fallow deer, D. dama  introduced
Subfamily: Capreolinae
Genus: Alces
 Moose, A. alces 
Genus: Capreolus
 Roe deer, C. capreolus 
Family: Suidae (pigs)
Subfamily: Suinae
Genus: Sus
Wild boar, S. scrofa

Locally extinct 
The following species are locally extinct in the country:
 Bavarian pine vole, Microtus bavaricus
 Common bent-wing bat, Miniopterus schreibersii
 European mink, Mustela lutreola
 European ground squirrel, Spermophilus citellus
 Brown bear, Ursus arctos

See also
List of chordate orders
Lists of mammals by region
Mammal classification

References

External links

Germany
Mammals
Mammals
Germany